Interstate 20 has 15 business routes located in Texas and one additional route in South Carolina:
Business routes of Interstate 20 in Texas
Interstate 20 Business (Florence, South Carolina)

See also
 List of business routes of the Interstate Highway System#Interstate 20

20
Interstate 20